The Triad is a 2016 album by Pantha du Prince.

Production 

In May 2014, Pantha du Prince began a three-month residency at the Villa Aurora artists' retreat in Los Angeles alongside guitarist Scott Mou and drummer Bendik Hovik Kjeldsberg—together known as "The Triad".

The Triad followed Black Noise (2010) as Pantha du Prince's first solo album in six years, released on May 20, 2016. Its first single, "The Winter Hymn", released earlier that year, on February 19 alongside a music video. Whereas Black Noise was composed in isolation, The Triad involved more in-person jamming.

Reception 

The Triad received "generally favorable" critic reviews, according to review aggregator Metacritic.

References 

2016 albums
Pantha du Prince albums